The Toledo, Cincinnati and St. Louis Railroad (TC&StL) was a  narrow-gauge railroad based in Ohio. It began as a subsidiary of the  narrow-gauge Toledo, Delphos and Burlington Railroad (TD&B), which was opened on July 4, 1875, but in 1882 the two companies merged and retained the TC&StL name, which was more descriptive of its extent.

Toledo, Delphos and Burlington Railroad itself originally came about from a merger of several other railroads, including the  Iron Railroad founded on February 2, 1848, based in Ironton, Ohio.  In 1881, the TD&B reached an agreement with the Iron Railroad to dual-gauge a segment of its line by laying its own  narrow-gauge track in-between the Iron Railroad's track.  Both railroads merged later that same year, retaining the TD&B name.

The financially troubled Toledo, Cincinnati and St. Louis Railroad system eventually entered receivership in 1883 and was split at foreclosure in 1884 and 1885 as follows:

 St. Louis and Toledo Divisions (split at Kokomo), completed by the TC&StL: Toledo, St. Louis and Kansas City Railroad (NKP)
 Cincinnati Division
 Built by the TD&B (Lebanon Junction to Dayton): Dayton, Lebanon and Cincinnati Railroad (Pennsy)
 Ex-Cincinnati Northern Railway: Cincinnati, Lebanon and Northern Railway (Pennsy)
 Dayton Division, completed by the TD&B (Delphos to Dayton): Dayton and Toledo Railroad (B&O)
 Southeastern Division, ex-Dayton and South Eastern Railroad (Dayton to Wellston): Dayton and Ironton Railroad (B&O)
 Ironton Division
 Constructed by the TC&StL (Deans to Ironton Junction): Dayton and Ironton Railroad (B&O)

References

Defunct Illinois railroads
Defunct Indiana railroads
Defunct Ohio railroads
Narrow gauge railroads in Illinois
Narrow gauge railroads in Indiana
Narrow gauge railroads in Ohio
Predecessors of the Pennsylvania Railroad
Predecessors of the Toledo, St. Louis and Western Railroad
Predecessors of the Detroit, Toledo and Ironton Railroad
Predecessors of the Baltimore and Ohio Railroad
Railway companies established in 1881
Railway companies disestablished in 1885
3 ft gauge railways in the United States
American companies established in 1881